Vriesea pauciflora is a plant species in the genus Vriesea. This species is endemic to Brazil.
The specific epithet pauciflora is Latin for 'few-flowered'.

References

pauciflora
Flora of Brazil